The Tignes Dam, also known as the Chevril Dam, is an arch dam on the Isère in the municipality of Tignes in the Rhône-Alpes region in south-eastern France. In planning since the 1920s and under the protest of locals, the dam was constructed between 1948 and 1952 with the purpose of hydroelectric power. At the time of its completion, it was the tallest dam in Europe. Water from the dam's reservoir, Lac du Chevril, feeds two power stations, the 96 MW Brevieres Power Station and the 332 MW Malgovert Power Station, for a total installed capacity of 428 MW. The yearly average combined output of the two power stations is 94 MW. The dam was designed by Coyne & Bellier and is currently owned and operated by Électricité de France. Lac du Chevril flooded the town of Tignes which was relocated nearby. 

In 1989, in preparation for the 1992 Winter Olympics, Jean-Marie Pierret painted a fresco of the Olympian figure Hercules on the dam's face. The feat, by Pierret and eight other painters, took 60 days.

The dam plays an important part in the French supernatural drama television series The Returned.

See also 

 Renewable energy in France

References

External links

Dams in France
RTignes
Arch dams
Dams completed in 1952
Hydroelectric power stations in France
1952 establishments in France
Energy infrastructure completed in 1953
20th-century architecture in France